Aglaia scortechinii is a species of plant in the family Meliaceae. It is found in Brunei, Indonesia, and Malaysia.

References

scortechinii
Vulnerable plants
Taxonomy articles created by Polbot